Michael Gandy may refer to:

Michael Gandy (architect) (1778–1862), English architect
Michael Gandy (cricketer) (born 1944), Australian cricketer
Mike Gandy (born 1979), American football offensive tackle